Isidella is a genus of deep-sea bamboo coral in the family Isididae.

Species 
According to the World Register of Marine Species, six species are recognized:
 Isidella elongata (Esper, 1788)
 Isidella lofotensis Sars, 1868
 Isidella longiflora (Verrill, 1883)
 Isidella tentaculum Etnoyer, 2008
 Isidella tenuis Cairns, 2018
 Isidella trichotoma Bayer, 1990

References

Isididae
Bioluminescent cnidarians
Octocorallia genera